Neogene pictus is a moth of the  family Sphingidae. It is known from Paraguay and northern Argentina.

References

Neogene (moth)
Moths described in 1931